Pachaikili Muthucharam is a 2007 Indian Tamil-language action thriller film directed by Gautham Vasudev Menon. It is based on the 2005 British-American thriller film Derailed. The film stars Sarathkumar and  Jyothika, while Andrea Jeremiah and Milind Soman played important supporting roles. The film's score and soundtrack were composed by Harris Jayaraj. The soundtrack was released on 20 January 2007 to positive reviews. The film was released on 13 February 2007. The movie was dubbed in Telugu as Drohi. It was remade in Sinhala language as Dakina Dakina Mal.

Plot
Venkatesh, a medical representative, is happily married to Kalyani, and they both have a son named Nanda. They all have a perfect life. That is, until Nanda falls sick, and things between Venkat and Kalyani cool down a bit. Kalyani begins to spend more time with Nanda and starts to ignore Venkat involuntarily. Venkat, feeling a bit lonely and neglected, walks in and out of his monotonous life without complaining much. He tries to understand his wife's feelings.

One morning while riding the train to work, Venkat notices Geetha and spends a few extra seconds admiring her. The following day again, he happens to stand next to her, and Geetha opens up the conversation with Venkat. Both married with kids, they feel that they have a lot of common things between them and start a friendship together. At first, it is platonic, and they meet only in the train, but they slowly start meeting at restaurants and coffee shops. Geetha begins to get a little physically close to Venkat, and she suggests that they both spend a day together watching movies or doing something alone. Venkat agrees, and they take a taxi and drive to Mayajaal on East Coast Road.

However, at the last minute, Geetha changes her mind and directs the taxi driver to go to a resort along the same road. Venkat books a room on Geetha's insistence. A knock on the door prompts Venkat to open the door. A goon barges in, beats him up, robs the couple, and ties Venkat up before raping Geetha. Venkat is grief-stricken, and he and Geetha both part ways. The goon, who calls himself Lawrence, starts calling Venkat and Geetha to harass them for money. Venkat takes the full financial responsibility and starts paying off money that he had been saving for Nanda's medical expenses. With no choice left, Venkat confesses to Kalyani. Angry and disappointed, she leaves him, but she returns a few days later and forgives him.

One day, Venkat finds Geetha and Lawrence laughing down the street. He follows them and realizes that he has been conned and that this is their daily business. When the gang is pulling the same trick on another person, he beats Lawrence, barges into a hotel, and explains it to the new guy. A fight occurs where Lawrence is killed, and Venkat assumes that Geetha is killed too. Venkat relocates with his family for a while, and then Geetha kidnaps Venkat's family. Finally, Venkat kills Geetha, and the family lives happily ever after.

Cast

Production
It was previously titled as Vilai Uyirendraalum (Even If the Price Is Life Itself), Parundhu (Eagle) and Silandhi (Spider). Gautham Menon described the title Pachaikili Muthucharam (translated as "a parrot with a string of pearls") as a metaphor to the film's content, saying, "What will happen to a string of pearls if a parrot gets it? The pearls might scatter away." Earlier for the lead female protagonist role several actresses was considered with Tabu, Kamalinee Mukherjee and Shobana as the frontrunners. Finally, the latter was chosen to play the role whom Gautham described as the "finest actor in the country".  However, Shobana was replaced by a newcomer Andrea Jeremiah, who previously collaborated with Gautham Menon in Vettaiyaadu Vilaiyaadu as a playback singer. Sarath Kumar's character was originally slated for Kamal Haasan, Madhavan and Cheran.

Soundtrack
The film has five songs composed by Harris Jayaraj. The song "Karu Karu Vizhigalal" is based on Westlife’s ‘Hit You With The Real Thing’.

Release
The satellite rights of the film were sold to Kalaignar. The censors cleared the film with an "A" certificate for its theme with no visual cuts but a few dialogue muting. Those who saw the film are raving about its bold and daring content and say that it looks like a Hollywood thriller.

Reception
A critic from Rediff wrote that "One must hand it to Gautham Menon for keeping the film from degenerating into a melodrama by giving the right mix of action and drama".

Box office 
The film was below average at the box office, especially because it was a typical A center movie. It performed badly at B and C centers due to its storyline. In regard to the average run, Menon went on to claim that Sarath Kumar was "wrong for the film" and that he tweaked the story to fit his image; he also claimed that his father's ailing health and consequent death a week before the release had left him mentally affected.

Awards and nominations 
2007 - Ananda Vikatan Cinema Awards

Notes

References

External links
 

2007 films
Films directed by Gautham Vasudev Menon
Films about adultery in India
2000s Tamil-language films
Films scored by Harris Jayaraj
Indian action thriller films
Indian drama films
Indian remakes of American films
2007 action thriller films
2007 drama films